Two warships of the Royal Navy have borne the name HMS Indomitable:

 was the first battlecruiser in the world, beating sister ship  by four months. She was launched in 1907 and scrapped in 1922.
 was an  armoured fleet aircraft carrier launched in 1940. She served in the Second World War and was scrapped in 1955.
HMS Indomitable was to have been an  aircraft carrier. She was renamed  in 1978, before being launched in 1980.

Battle honours
 Dogger Bank, 1915
 Jutland, 1916
 Malta Convoys 1942
 Diego Suarez 1942
 Sicily 1943
 Palembang 1945
 Okinawa 1945

In popular culture
 In early drafts of Herman Melville's novel Billy Budd, HMS Bellipotent was to have been named Indomitable. This title was used in Benjamin Britten's adaptation of the novel as an opera.

See also
 Indomitable (disambiguation)

Royal Navy ship names